Callipsygma is a genus of green algae in the family Udoteaceae.

References

External links

Bryopsidales genera
Udoteaceae